James Martin's cottage is located on Stirling Terrace in Toodyay, Western Australia.

It was originally a four-room construction that, unlike most on the street, was not built by convicts and was not on Pensioner Guards land. James Martin was one of four blacksmiths in Toodyay during the 1860s. He built the cottage around 1890 and lived there until his death. Martin's family lived on the property for many generations and it has since been an antiques shop and residence.

References 

Buildings and structures in Toodyay, Western Australia
Houses in Western Australia
Stirling Terrace, Toodyay